Bilz may refer to:

 Friedrich Eduard Bilz (1842–1922), German naturopath 
 Bilz y Pap, marketing name of soft drinks in Chile